Hazipur may refer to:

Places and locations 
 Hajipur, a city in Vaishali district, Bihar, India
 Hazipur, Alwar, a village in Alwar district, Rajasthan, India
 Hazipur, Sultanpur Lodhi, a village in Kapurthala district, Punjab, India